Surviving Suburbia is an American sitcom television series starring Bob Saget and Cynthia Stevenson that aired on American Broadcasting Company (ABC) from April 6 to August 7, 2009. The series originally aired at 9:30 PM Eastern/8:30 PM Central following Dancing with the Stars, before moving to Fridays at 8:30 PM Eastern/7:30 PM Central for its remaining episodes. It was the first program starring Saget to air on ABC since he left America's Funniest Home Videos in 1997.

On August 8, 2009, ABC Entertainment President Steve McPherson announced that Surviving Suburbia, along with The Goode Family, had officially been cancelled due to low ratings.

Premise
A half-hour comedy dubbed as a male version of Roseanne, Surviving Suburbia focused on a father named Steve Patterson (Bob Saget), his wife Anne (Cynthia Stevenson), and their two children, Henry and Courtney. The Pattersons lead ordinary, uneventful lives until their new next-door neighbors begin causing several problems, turning their suburban lifestyle upside-down.

Cast and characters
Bob Saget – Steve Patterson
Cynthia Stevenson – Anne Patterson
Jared Kusnitz – Henry Patterson
G. Hannelius – Courtney Patterson
Jere Burns – Dr. Jim
Dan Cortese – Onno
Lyndsey Jolly – Jenna
Lorna Scott – Monica
Melissa Peterman – Mrs. Muncie

Programming history
In 2008, The CW announced plans to air the comedy as part of their Sunday night programming block with Media Rights Capital or MRC. The series was set to air November 2, and 13 episodes were taped.

When the MRC block started, it faced very low ratings against other networks (especially with FOX's Animation Domination).  After only a few weeks the CW pulled the entire block and announced that the status of Suburbia's air date was TBA. An additional factor in scheduling changes may have been the fact that Media Rights Capital had been unable to keep up with the set production schedule and had begun running out of episodes.  CW never released any announcements concerning the series' air date.

On February 6, 2009, ABC, which had previously aired two shows with Bob Saget: Full House and America's Funniest Home Videos,  announced that it would be airing Surviving Suburbia starting April 6.

When the first episode aired, it garnered 12.16 million viewers and 3.2/8 million viewers in the 18–49 demographics but ratings kept dropping and it lost a lot of the audience of its lead-in, Dancing with the Stars.

Surviving Suburbia returned to the 8:00PM Eastern/7:00PM Central slot on Friday, June 12 and finished its first and only season on Friday, August 7.

Episodes

Weekly ratings

International airings
The program premiered on October 2009 in Greece on Greece's Fox Life. In Portugal, it airs every weekday at 9:45 on Fox Life.

References

External links
 
 SitcomsOnline.com Review of Surviving Suburbia

2000s American sitcoms
2009 American television series debuts
2009 American television series endings
American Broadcasting Company original programming
English-language television shows
Television series by Media Rights Capital
Television shows set in Los Angeles